Penruddock is an English surname. Notable people with the surname include:

George Penruddock (by 1527–1581), Member of Parliament for Salisbury, Wiltshire and Pembroke
John Penruddock (bef.1542-1601), Member of Parliament for Wilton and Southampton
John Penruddock (1619–1655), Cavalier, leader of the Penruddock uprising in 1655
Robert Penruddock, Member of Parliament for Cumberland
Thomas Penruddock (c.1578-1637), Member of Parliament for Downton and Cumberland

See also
Penruddocke